The 1991 FIBA Europe Under-16 Championship (known at that time as 1991 European Championship for Cadets) was the 11th edition of the FIBA Europe Under-16 Championship. The cities of Kastoria, Komotini and Thessaloniki, in Greece, hosted the tournament. Italy won the trophy for the first time.

Teams

Preliminary round
The twelve teams were allocated in two groups of six teams each.

Group A

Group B

Knockout stage

9th–12th playoffs

5th–8th playoffs

Championship

Final standings

References
FIBA Archive
FIBA Europe Archive

FIBA U16 European Championship
1991–92 in European basketball
1991–92 in Greek basketball
International youth basketball competitions hosted by Greece